The 1933 European Rowing Championships were rowing championships held on the Danube in the Hungarian capital city of Budapest. The competition was for men only and they competed in all seven Olympic boat classes (M1x, M2x, M2-, M2+, M4-, M4+, M8+).

Medal summary

References

European Rowing Championships
European Rowing Championships
Rowing
Rowing
European Rowing Championships
International sports competitions in Budapest